Rebecchi is a surname. Notable people with the surname include:

Carla Rebecchi (born 1984), Argentine field hockey player
Jennifer Lee (born 1971), born Jennifer Michelle Rebecchi, American screenwriter and film director
Mario Rebecchi (born 1983), Italian footballer
Rafael Rebecchi, 19th century architect, mainly active in Rio de Janeiro

Fictional characters
Angie Rebecchi, a character in the Australian soap opera Neighbours
Kevin Rebecchi, a character in the Australian soap opera Neighbours
Stonefish Rebecchi, a character in the Australian soap opera Neighbours
Toadfish Rebecchi, a character in the Australian soap opera Neighbours
Nell Rebecchi, a character in the Australian soap opera Neighbours

Italian-language surnames